John Klebér Saarenpää (born 14 December 1975) is a Swedish football manager who is the current head coach of Superettan club IK Brage. He is also a former professional footballer who played as a defender. He represented IK Sirius, Djurgårdens IF, IFK Norrköping, AaB, Hammarby IF, and Vejle during a career that spanned between 1992 and 2008. A full international between 2000 and 2001, he won 11 caps for the Sweden national team.

Club career 
Saarenpää was born in Uppsala, of Finnish and Guinean descent, and started his career in local team Stäppens IF.

Saarenpää represented Djurgårdens IF, IFK Norrköping, Hammarby IF and AaB (in Denmark). He made a contract with the Danish club Vejle Boldklub from 1 January 2007. On 10 March 2007 the defender debuted as captain for Vejle Boldklub and scored two goals. His contract with Vejle Boldklub only ran until 30 June 2007 and Saarenpää has therefore played his last match for the club. After that he returned to his old club Hammarby IF and signed a two-year contract with the Stockholm based club. He ended his career after the 2008 season.

International career 
Internationally, Saarenpää represented the Sweden U17, U19, and U21 teams a total of 30 times before making his full international debut for the Sweden national team on 31 January 2000 in a friendly game against Denmark. He made his competitive debut for Sweden in a 2002 FIFA World Cup qualifier against Slovakia, in which he played in all 90 minutes as Sweden won 2–0. He appeared in four more qualifying games for the 2002 FIFA World Cup, but missed the final tournament because of an injury. He won a total of 11 caps between 2000 and 2001.

Coaching career 
In January 2014 he signed a 2.5 year contract with Vejle Boldklub as an Assistant Manager. In October of the same year he was promoted to Manager of Vejle Boldklub after the former Manager Tonny Hermansen withdrew from the position. He was sacked on 23 April 2016.

Personal life 
Saarenpää also has Finnish citizenship.

References

External links
 Vejle Boldklub profile
 AaB profile

1975 births
Living people
Association football defenders
Swedish footballers
Swedish people of Finnish descent
Swedish people of Guinean descent
Sweden international footballers
Sweden under-21 international footballers
Sweden youth international footballers
Swedish expatriate footballers
Allsvenskan players
Danish Superliga players
IFK Norrköping players
AaB Fodbold players
Vejle Boldklub players
Djurgårdens IF Fotboll players
Hammarby Fotboll players
Expatriate men's footballers in Denmark
Hammarby Fotboll non-playing staff
Footballers from Uppsala